In Islamic law (sharia), marriage (nikāḥ نکاح) is a legal and social contract between two individuals. Marriage is an act of Islam and is strongly recommended. Polygyny is permitted in Islam under some conditions, but polyandry is forbidden.

Types of marriage

Nikāḥ

The Nikāḥ (Arabic: نكاح, literally, "to collect and bind together") is the first—and most common—form of marriage for Muslims. It is described in the Qur'an in Surah 4:4.

Regulations:
While intended to be a permanent state, it can be terminated by the husband engaging in the Talaq process or the wife seeking a Khula.
The couple inherit from each other.
A legal contract is signed when entering the marriage. However it is not a requirement that the contract be in writing. It may be oral, especially amongst illiterates; and if an agreed end-date is specified in the nikāḥ contract:
In Sunni jurisprudence, the contract is invalid.
In Shia jurisprudence, the contract defines a temporary marriage, nikāḥ mut'ah.

Requirement of witnesses:
two witnesses from both sides

Permission from Wali:
Sunni: Compulsory (Maliki, Shafi'i, Hanbali) or Strongly recommended (Hanafi)
Shia: Depending on the scholar, it is either obligatory or obligatory based on precaution.

Nikah Halala

Nikah halala is also known as tahleel marriage and is a practice in which a woman, after being divorced by a final divorce, marries another man, consummates the marriage, and divorces immediately for the sole purpose of remarrying her former husband. It is prohibited in Islamic law.

Nikāḥ Ijtimaa 

Nikah ijtimaa, or combined marriage, is a form of marriage practiced in pre-Islamic Arabia, in which multiple men would have intercourse with a woman, and if she bore a child, she would choose one of the men to be the father of the child. This form of marriage was outlawed by Islam, which requires that any man and woman be married prior to sexual intercourse.

Nikah Istibdaa
Nikah Istibdaa is a marriage ( نکاح استبضاع) in which a husband would send his wife to another person, usually of noble lineage, to have sexual relations with him. The husband would refrain from sexual relations with his wife until she became pregnant by the other man. Afterwards, the man would claim paternity of the conceived child. This was done to get a child of noble breed. It was eradicated by Islam.

Nikāḥ Misyar

Nikāḥ Misyaar is a nikāḥ for Sunnis carried out via the normal contractual procedure, with the specificity that the husband and wife give up several rights by their own free will, such as living together, equal division of nights between wives in cases of polygamy, the wife's rights to housing, and maintenance money ("nafaqa"), and the husband's right of homekeeping, and access etc. The difference between this and Mut'ah is that Mut'ah has the condition of a definite time period and a separation date prior to a marriage contract. Sunnah scholars have said it is permissible to marry a woman with the intention of getting divorced, if the wife is not informed or expecting a divorce during a marriage contract.

Nikāḥ ‘urfī

Nikāḥ Mut‘ah

Nikah mut'ah , literally "pleasure marriage"; temporary marriage or sigheh is a private and verbal temporary marriage contract that is practiced in Twelver Shia Islam in which the duration of the marriage and the mahr must be specified and agreed upon in advance. It is a private contract made in a verbal or written format. A declaration of the intent to marry and an acceptance of the terms are required as in other forms of marriage in Islam.

According to Shia Muslims, Muhammad sanctioned nikah mut'ah (fixed-term marriage, called muta'a in Iraq and sigheh in Iran), which has instead been used as a legitimizing cover for sex workers in a culture where prostitution is otherwise forbidden. Some Western writers have argued that mut'ah approximates prostitution.

Some sources say the Nikah mut'ah has no prescribed minimum or maximum duration, but others, such as The Oxford Dictionary of Islam, indicate the minimum duration of the marriage is debatable and durations of at least three days, three months or one year have been suggested.

Some Muslims and Western scholars have stated that both Nikah mut'ah and Nikah misyar are Islamically void attempts to religiously sanction prostitution which is otherwise forbidden. The Zaidi Shia reject Mutah marriage.

Nikāḥ Shighār
Nikāḥ Shighā is marriage (نکاح شغار) in which two men would exchange their daughters, sisters or other close women for marriage without paying mahr. It was prohibited by Muhammad.

Interfaith marriage

Interfaith marriages are recognized between Muslims and Non-Muslim People of the Book (usually enumerated as Jews, Christians, and Sabians). Historically, in Islamic culture and traditional Islamic law Muslim women have been forbidden from marrying Christian or Jewish men, whereas Muslim men have been permitted to marry Christian or Jewish women.

Although historically Sunni Islam prohibited Muslim women to marry Non-Muslim men in interfaith marriages, in various parts of the world interfaith marriages between Muslim women and Non-Muslim men take place at substantial rates, contravening the traditional Sunni understanding of ijma. For example, in the United States, about 10% of Muslim women are married to Non-Muslim men. The tradition of reformist and progressive Islam does permit marriage between Muslim women and Non-Muslim men; Islamic scholars opining this view include Khaleel Mohammed, Hassan Al-Turabi, among others.

Restrictions on marriage

Polygyny

Muslim men are allowed to practise polygyny, that is, they can have more than one wife at the same time, up to four, per Sura 4 Verse 3.

Polyandry, the practice of a woman having more than one husband, by contrast, is not permitted. One of the main reasons for this would be the potential questioning of paternal lineage. The Quran states: (30:21): “And among His signs is that He has created for you, from your selves, mates, that you may incline towards them and find rest in them, and He has engendered love and tenderness between you. Surely in this are signs for people who reflect.”

Permissible age
Sahih Muslim permits marriage once a person reaches sexual maturity (i.e.: menstruation, voice changing, wet dreams)  (baligh). Sexual maturity in Sharia law is typically understood to mean puberty. At the same time, intercourse is forbidden until they are able to physically bear it.

Other religions

Traditionally, Muslim jurists hold that Muslim women may only enter into marriage with Muslim men. The Qur'an explicitly allows Muslim men to marry chaste women of the People of the Book, a term which includes Jews and Christians.

Arranged and forced marriages
An engagement may be arranged between families for their children, but Islamic requirements for a legal marriage include the requirement that both parties, bride, groom and guardian for the bride (wali), give their legal consent. A marriage without the consent of the bride or performed under coercion is illegal according to the majority of scholars.

If a girl has not attained the age of puberty, the vast majority of scholars hold that she cannot be married; and many stipulate that it must be in her best interest in order to be considered a valid marriage. There is some dispute as to whether or not an under-age bride can leave her family's custody and be transferred to her husband's custody, if she has not yet reached puberty. Some evidence supporting both sides can be seen in the following narrations from Muhammad:

Sahih Bukhari Volume 7, Book 62, Number 65 Narrated 'Aisha: that the Prophet married her when she was six years old and he consummated his marriage when she was nine years old. Hisham said: I have been informed that 'Aisha remained with the Prophet for nine years (i.e. till his death).

Sahih Bukhari 7.18 Narrated 'Ursa: The Prophet asked Abu Bakr for 'Aisha's hand in marriage. Abu Bakr said "But I am your brother." The Prophet said, "You are my brother in Allah's religion and His Book, but she (Aisha) is lawful for me to marry."

However, evidence from other Islamic sources seems to suggest that this is not something allowed for all Muslims; rather specifically for Muhammad. The evidence for this view is as follows:

Abu Hurayrah reported that the Prophet said: "A non-virgin woman may not be married without her command, and a virgin may not be married without her permission; and it is permission enough for her to remain silent (because of her natural shyness)." [Al-Bukhari:6455, Muslim & Others]

It is reported in a hadith that A'ishah related that she once asked the Prophet: "In the case of a young girl whose parents marry her off, should her permission be sought or not?" He replied: "Yes, she must give her permission." She then said: "But a virgin would be shy, O Messenger of Allaah!" He replied: "Her silence is [considered as] her permission." [Al-Bukhari, Muslim, & Others]

It appears that the permission of an under-age bride is indeed necessary for her marriage to be considered valid; the above narrations seem to clearly make the approval of the bride a condition for a valid marriage contract.

Adulterers
Islam does not give adulterous men the right to marry a chaste woman, nor may an adulterous woman marry a chaste man, except if the matter has not gone to court and the two purify themselves of this sin by sincere repentance.

Other
A woman or man may propose marriage directly or through an intermediary (matchmaker).

Homosexual marriage between Muslims is not recognized within Islamic law, based on explicit verses of the Qur'an and the traditional view of homosexual practices as illicit.

Wedding rings were not widespread across Muslim cultures in antiquity; however, many Muslims today have adopted the tradition of wearing a wedding band alongside other practices originated from European tradition.

Mahr

Mahr is a mandatory gift given by the groom to the bride. Unlike a bride price, however, it is given directly to the bride and not to her father.  Although the gift is often money, it can be anything agreed upon by bride and groom such as a house or viable business that is put in her name and can be run and owned entirely by her if she chooses.

Islamic marriage contract

A Muslim marriage is not a sacrament, but a simple, legal agreement in which either partner is free to include conditions. These conditions are stipulated in a written contract. Violating any of the conditions stipulated in this contract is legal grounds for a partner seeking divorce. The first part of the Nikah, "marriage ceremony", is the signing of the marriage contract itself.

Various traditions may differ in how Nikah is performed because different groups accept different texts as authoritative. Therefore, Sunnis will likely accept the hadith of Muhammad al-Bukhari, while Shia will have their own collections, for example Furu al-Kafi, thus producing different procedures. This contract requires the consent of both parties. There is a tradition, outside of the religion, in some Muslim countries to pre-arrange a marriage for young children. However, the marriage still requires consent for the wedding to legally take place.

Divorce is not forbidden as a last resort, but the dissolution of the contract Talaq, is often described as the most disliked of permissible things in Islam and should be used as a last resort.

Walima

The Walima is a dinner given by the groom's side of the family to celebrate the welcoming of the bride to the family. It is a strong sunnah (the repetition of an action of Muhammad) and it is recommended to be held the earliest possible day after the Nikah.

Behavior within marriage

Spousal rights and obligations

Islam advocates a role-based relationship between husband and wife.

Abd Allah ibn Umar narrated:

It puts the main responsibility of earning over the husband. Both are obliged to fulfill the other's sexual needs. Both are obliged to treat each other with kindness.

Separate accommodation for wife
The wife has the right to live in separate accommodation with her husband and children, if she does not want to share it with anyone like her in-law or relatives. This is the view of most of the Hanafi, Shaafa'i and Hanbali fuqaha. She also has the right to refuse to live with her husband's father, mother and siblings.

Narrated Abdullah bin Umar: That he heard Allah's Apostle saying, "Everyone of you is a guardian and is responsible for his charge; the ruler is a guardian and is responsible for his subjects; the man is a guardian in his family and responsible for his charges; a woman is a guardian of her husband's house and responsible for her charges; and the servant is a guardian of his master's property and is responsible for his charge." I definitely heard the above from the Prophet and think that the Prophet also said, "A man is a guardian of his father's property and responsible for his charges; so everyone of you is a guardian and responsible for his charges." [Sahih Bukhari]

This indicates that a wife is responsible for the house of her husband. Also that a man should be the guardian of his family, i.e., after his marriage he moves out of his father's house, and runs his own family affairs and is guardian of his family. In a joint family, typically the head is either the father of the husband, or mother of the husband. This also indicates that a husband should look after his parents' house, as "a man is a guardian of his father's property". So the wife should not object to her husband when he is looking after affairs of his parents.

Sexuality

Sexuality in Islam is largely described by the Qur'an, Islamic tradition, and religious leaders both past and present as being confined to marital relationships between men and women. While most traditions discourage celibacy, all encourage strict chastity and modesty (see haya) with regards to any relationships across gender lines, holding forth that intimacy as perceived within Islam (encompassing a swath of life more broad than strictly sex) is to be reserved for marriage.

Abd Allah ibn Mas'ud narrated:

While adulterous relationships are strictly forbidden, permissible sexual relationships within marriage are described in Islamic sources as great wells of love and closeness for the couple involved. Sexual relationship between married couples are even source of rewards from God as doing the opposite, i.e., satisfying sexual needs through illicit means, has punishment. Specific occasions (most notably daytime fasting (see sawm) and menstruation) are times forbidden for intercourse, though not for other ways of touching and being close to one another. Anal sex with one's wife is also strictly prohibited.

Islam has an open and playful approach to sex so long as it is within marriage, free of lewdness, fornication and adultery.

Gender roles
The Qur'an asserts that there are innate differences between women and men. Therefore, Islam places different rights over the husband and wife.

Some similar rights which both the husband and wife owe to each other are:
 The right to enjoy each other.
 The right to inherit from each other.
 The right of confirmation of the lineage of their children.

Some rights which the husband owes to his wife are:
 The dower (Mahr)
 Support
 Kind and proper treatment
 Marital relations
 Privacy
 Justice between multiple wives
 To be taught her religion
 Defense of her honor

Some rights which the wife owes to her husband are:

 Being head of the household
 To be obeyed in all that is not disobedience to Allah
 Marital relations
 That she not allow anyone in the house of whom he disapproves
 That she not leave the house without his permission
 That she protect his property
 To be thanked for his efforts
 That she can only undertake a voluntary fast with his permission

These are some of the rights which spouses owe one another.

See also
Beena a form of marriage used in pre-Islamic Arabia
Islamic views on slavery
Marriage and wedding customs in Islam
The Sermon for Necessities
Women in Islam

References

Further reading

External links
 Marriage in Islamic Law
 E-Book: Marriage A Form of Ibada
 E-Book: Wedding Customs and Non-Islamic Traditions
 Rights of husband and wife, and issues with joint family system
 The Etiquettes of Muslim Marriage
 Islamic Philosophy of Marriage
 VIDEO: British Man and French Woman talk about Becoming Muslims and how they got married.
 VIDEO: A French Muslim Convert Talks about Hijab and Marriage
 crescentlife.com's "Fundamentals of a happy marriage", a Muslim view of marriage structured around "21 F's", words beginning in F such as Faith, Forgiving, Forget, Forbearance, and so on.  Similar content exists in multiple other sources, credited to various authors or uncredited.
 Why Muslim Singles Cannot Get Married
 The Wali in Islam:1,2,3,4,5
 Islam Marriages and Qur’an Teachings
 QuranicPath | Marriage of Believers

 
Islamic jurisprudence